Andreas Janc (1 February 1938 – 30 November 2018) was an Austrian cross-country skier. He competed at the 1964 Winter Olympics and the 1968 Winter Olympics.

References

External links
 

1938 births
2018 deaths
Austrian male cross-country skiers
Austrian people of Slovenian descent
Olympic cross-country skiers of Austria
Cross-country skiers at the 1964 Winter Olympics
Cross-country skiers at the 1968 Winter Olympics
People from the Municipality of Žirovnica
20th-century Austrian people